10 is the tenth album recorded by Spanish rock band Hombres G, released in 2007.

10 is described as tuning into the "raw energy of early rock" and hinting at Euro-rock and at the "atmospheric aesthetic favored by Coldplay and the legendary U2" by Allmusic. The album cover depicts the band standing outside 10 Downing Street, London.

The album was nominated for "Best Pop Album By A Duo or Group With Vocal" at the 2008 Latin Grammy Awards.

Track listing

Chart history

Personnel 

 David Summers – vocals, bass
 Rafa Gutiérrez – guitar
 Daniel Mezquita – guitar
 Javier Molina – drums

References

External links
 Official site
 Discography

2007 albums
Hombres G albums
Warner Music Group albums
Spanish-language albums
Albums produced by Carlos Jean